The Batiscan River is located in La Mauricie administrative region, in the Quebec province, Canada. This river flows  from Lake Édouard in Mauricie south and west to empty into the St. Lawrence River at Batiscan, Quebec, northeast of Trois-Rivières, Quebec. It passes through the regional county municipalities (RCM) (MRC in French) of La Tuque, Portneuf, Mékinac and Les Chenaux.

The river traverses a territory covered mainly by forest from its source to the Saint-Adelphe, Quebec railway bridge; the rest of its course is predominantly agricultural. The Batiscan river valley is designated "Batiscanie, Quebec". Today, this valley is a paradise for camping, vacationing, observations of nature and water activities such as canoeing, kayaking, rafting, pontoon and swimming in designated areas. The Batiscan River is a popular Canadian whitewater kayaking destination, providing numerous class III, IV, and V rapids.

Toponymy 
The river was named in 1602 by Samuel de Champlain.  He reported in 1610 that it was named for an Algonquin chief of the same name; however, this name was in use by Amerindian natives before the arrival of the first French explorers. The name "Batiscan" has been interpreted differently by various sources.  Father Charles Arnaud argued that the name meant "steam cloud or light", or possibly "spray of dried meat". According to Pierre-Georges Roy the name means "who rushes to his mouth", which has been observed in the past. According to Father Albert Lacombe the name came from the Atikamekw term meaning "hoof or pending"; according to Father Joseph-Étienne Guinard, it derived from the cry "patiskam", meaning "stumble".

Geography

Course 

Starting from Lake Édouard, the Batiscan River flows  before flowing successively through three lakes in the centre of which is the Lake of the Cross (Lac-Édouard). Then the river flows another unit  before passing through another lake, which also receives the discharge from the north of the sub-watershed Lac aux Biscuits. This northern sub-basin is considered as the second head of the river.

The Seigneurie du Triton, built in 1897 on the edge of Lake of the Cross, administers a hunting and fishing on  space. This outfitter is one of the oldest clubs in private hunting and fishing in Quebec. The outfitter offers several activities including interpretive trails for nature walks and canoe, visits to beaver habitat and spawning (breeding trout), visiting the Triton station, pedal boating, and swimming. In this area, several hiking trails are maintained by the Society of Wildlife and Parks of Quebec, including linking the Lac aux Biscuits.

In the first segment  of its course, the Batiscan River flows through eight lakes (several being made by the swelling of the river) including two smallest.

Batiscan Lake is the second head of the Batiscan River. This elongated lake which is located in the MRC de La Jacques-Cartier (the unorganized territory of Lac-Croche). Batiscan Lake is especially fed by Croche River, lies outside the southwestern boundary of the Laurentian Wildlife Reserve. This lake discharges into the "Rivière aux éclairs" (Lightning River), which runs westward for  before flowing into the Batiscan River.

From Lake of the Cross, the Batiscan River flows successively in a wilderness (the limit of the Zec Jeannotte and Laurentides Wildlife Reserve), and the Portneuf Wildlife Reserve. Then the river descends through Rivière-à-Pierre (western boundary of the municipality), Notre-Dame-de-Montauban, Quebec, Lac-aux-Sables, Sainte-Thècle, Quebec (Eastern limit of the municipality), Saint-Adelphe, Quebec, Saint-Stanislas, Saint-Narcisse, Quebec (limit of the municipality) Sainte-Geneviève-de-Batiscan, Quebec and Batiscan, Quebec.

The river runs through a mostly forested area from its source to the bridge over railway at Saint-Adelphe (with the exception of some agricultural areas close to St-Alphonse and Price, Lac-aux-Sables), and in the vicinity of Rousseau Road north of town Notre-Dame-de-Montauban and Main Street (south of the same village.) The rest of the course of the Batiscan is predominantly agricultural.

Main waterfalls

The main waterfalls (or rapids) of the Batiscan River are (starting from the head of the river):

Upper Batiscanie:

Note: Upper Batiscanie begins at the mouth of the Rivière-à-Pierre that empties into the Batiscan River, at kilometre 88.5.

This section of the river is only accessible by train, or for those who wish to canoe-camp;
 continuing rapids of class III and IV (ideal for rafting) in the section "Portes de l'enfer" (Gates of Hell) on 25 km upstream of Rivière-à-Pierre, between Island of the Cross (Île-de-la-Croix) and the beginning of the Portneuf Wildlife Reserve;
 Series of rapids in the Portneuf Wildlife Reserve, several tens of kilometres: Trois-Roches (Three Rocks) Rapids, rapids "de la Sauvagesse" (Savage Rapid), Rapids "à Thiffault";
 Series of rapids between the Talbot bridge and Mount Otis (north of the village of Notre-Dame-de-Montauban), particularly at km 98.5, km 88 and km 84;

Mid Batiscanie

Note: Mid Batiscanie lies between Murphy Falls (Saint-Stanislas) and the mouth of the Rivière-à-Pierre at km 88.5.

 Fall of the Ten;
 Fall of the Nine, located upstream of the bridge in the village of Notre-Dame-des-Anges;
 Fall in the Seven, located downstream of row Price bridge (Lac-aux-Sables) and the mouth of the Tawachiche River);
This drop is in a forested area without paths;
 Manitou fall, between Saint-Adelphe and Saint-Stanislas (Des Chenaux);
 Falls to Jimmy;
 Falls to Murphy to Saint-Stanislas (Des Chenaux);

The river has some rapids or falls between Notre-Dame-de-Montauban and Saint-Adelphe. The Fall of the two and Fall of manitou are located in the latter locality.

The Batiscan River falls are numbered from 1 to 10, from Saint-Narcisse going back to Notre-Dame-de-Montauban. 4–7 drops are less crowded because less accessible, being located in wilderness areas.

Lower Batiscanie

Note: Lower Batiscanie lies between the mouth of the Batiscan River and the foot of the Falls to Murphy (Saint-Stanislas (Des Chenaux))

 Fall des Ailes (Fall of the Wings);
 Ilets fall;
 "Grande chute" (Great Fall) (altitude ), in Saint-Narcisse (west side of the river) and Sainte-Geneviève-de-Batiscan (East side), where the Saint-Narcisse dam is built;
 "chutes de la Cheminée" (Falls of the chimney) (altitude 15 metres) in Sainte-Geneviève-de-Batiscan.

The "Jesuit Journal" of April 20, 1657 reports from a trip fur trade on the Batiscan River, from April 20 to July 15, 1657, carried out by eight French from Trois-Rivières, with twenty canoes Algonquins. Starting from Trois-Rivières, the group passed 28 jumps on Batiscan River in 14 days, arriving at the end of their journey as of May 28, 1657. In total, the group crossed 74 jumps or portage. A French was then drowned.

The 1663 Charlevoix earthquake would have changed significantly the relief in the Batiscanie including the disappearance of jumps in the Batiscan River, the emergence of new rocks, flattening of some mountains, major cracks in the ground.

Hydrology 

Its flow, which is measured at the central Saint-Narcisse is /s. Flow has however a strong seasonal variation, with a maximum of /s in May and a minimum of unity /s in September. The last  unit, Batiscan River empties into the St. Lawrence River.

The basin is composed of a hundred rivers. The main rivers which are tributaries of the Batiscan, from upstream to downstream, are the river Castor noir, Lightning river, Jeannotte, Miguick, Rivière-à-Pierre, Tawachiche and Rivière-des-Envies.

The basin includes a thousand lakes. The largest lakes are Lac Édouard , Batiscan , Lac-aux-Sables , Masketsi , Lac-à-la-Tortue (Turtle Lake) , Lake Jesuit  and Roberge .

History 
In 1639, the Jesuits made the acquisition of lordship of Batiscan in order to evangelize the Attikameks. They do not settled in the colony, although they used the river up to the nineteenth century for the fur trade. In 1685, the Jesuits conceded the first batches of the Lordship, to the settlers established mainly in Sainte-Geneviève-de-Batiscan. In 1781, they installed a flour mill on Rivière des Envies, tributaries deemed easier than Batiscan river. In 1786, a chapel was built in Saint-Stanislas (Des Chenaux). Toward the end of nineteenth century, the municipalities were founded: Saint-Séverin, Saint-Tite, Sainte-Thècle, Saint-Adelphe and Lac-aux-Sables.

Forest industry 
From 1852 the William Price and Company began to exploit the forest. Several sawmills were built on the Batiscan River and Rivière des Envies. The timber was transported by water flow, requiring that workers had to drave the logs. The first trees were cut the White Pine sent to Great Britain. From the 1930, activities of logging turned and served rather to papers mills. In 1963 the log drive was abandoned on the Batiscan.

Former Saint Narcisse Electric Central 
In 1896, Jean-Baptiste Frégault bought the North Shore Power Company and buy production rights on the Great Waterfall near Saint-Narcisse. The plant was expanded in 1905. In 1907, it was sold to the Shawinigan Water & Power Company. The latter was replaced by a new central Saint-Narcisse in 1926. In 1963, it was acquired by Hydro-Quebec during the nationalization of electricity. This central Saint-Narcisse has a capacity of 15 MW.

Forges and mineral resources 
Iron deposits were exploited from the 18th century until the early 20th century. Two forges were opened in the watershed, the "Forges de Batiscan", between 1798 and 1813, and "Forges de Saint-Tite", between 1870 and 1888. A zinc and lead deposit was exploited in Notre-Dame-de-Montauban in 1911 and 1965. A copper and nickel deposit was exploited to Lake Édouard in 1973 and 1974.

Bridges 
Major bridges built over the Batiscan river (from the mouth):

Lower Batiscanie
 Bridge of road 138, Principale street, in Batiscan, built at about 500 meters upstream from the Batiscan river mouth emptying in St. Lawrence river;
 Batiscan railway bridge, built at about 800 meters upstream from the bridge of road 138;
 Two bridges of Highway 40, in Sainte-Geneviève-de-Batiscan, built at about 2500 meters above the Batiscan railway bridge;
 Sainte-Geneviève-de-Batiscan bridge, located at the height of the village (in front of the church), built at about 2.5 km upstream from the Highway 40 bridge, connecting Church Street (north shore) and the road of the village of Champlain (south shore). The first toll bridge was built in 1870 to replace the ferry, but unfortunately the bridge was washed away in 1896. The ferry system is restored for two months. In 1917, flood waters caused the collapse of one of the arches of the bridge. The municipality then acquires the bridge and repairs. This bridge existed until 1968 when it was demolished to be replaced by the current bridge.
 Passerelle pedestrian crossing the river to almost one kilometre from the water (or 550 meters in a straight line) downstream of the dam of Saint-Narcisse;
 Saint-Narcisse electric dam;
 Bridge for pedestrians built at the falls in Murphy, located 3.3 km from water (or 2.5 km direct line) upstream of the dam of Saint-Narcisse.

Mid Batiscanie
 Saint-Stanislas (Des Chenaux) bridge, located at the height of the village, built at about 8.5 km upstream of the dam of Saint-Narcisse;
 Cement bridge of Saint-Adelphe, located at the height of the rue du Moulin in the village, about 15.5 km upstream from the bridge of Saint-Stanislas (Des Chenaux) bridge,
 Covered wooden bridge of Saint-Adelphe, upstream of the other bridge built in cement. Wooden bridge was built in 1924 and demolished in 1965, after the construction of the cement bridge. Covered Bridge had a pedestrian sidewalk on the southeast side;
 Saint-Adelphe Railway Bridge linking row St-Pie and row Haut-St-Emile, built at about 2.8 km upstream from the bridge of the village. The railway bridge Saint-Adelphe was built in 1907. Trains have circulated for 100 years. The old iron bridge was decommissioned in 2007.
 Lac-aux-Sables bridge, linking the village and the road of row Price leading to Saint-Ubalde, about 14 km upstream of the railway bridge of Saint-Adelphe. The covered wooden bridge spanning the Batiscan, between the village and the road of row Price, was built in 1900. It was destroyed by fire on June 14, 1950. The bridge was rebuilt in 1952.
 Notre-Dame-de-Montauban bridge, located at the height of the village, built at about 12 km upstream from the bridge of Lac-aux-Sables.
 Railway bridge, located 4.2 km upstream from the bridge of Notre-Dame-de-Montauban. This bridge allows the train from Hervey-Jonction to head to Rivière-à-Pierre, along Rousseau road (route 367).

Upper Batiscanie
 Talbot Road bridge at kilometre no. 102 or 13.5 km from the river upstream from the mouth (km no. 88.5) of Rivière-à-Pierre. Between kilometre 102 and 88.5, the river has many rapids, some suitable for experienced kayakers. The Talbot bridge allows the Portneuf Wildlife Reserve to serve its territory lying west of the river Batiscan, especially larger lakes such Gilardeau, Lapeyrène, Robinson and Lake Travers.
 Bridge of "Ile-à-la-Croix" (Island of the cross (Quebec)), located at the northern limit of the Portneuf Wildlife Reserve for part of the territory east of the river Batiscan. The bridge also provides access to the road leading to the northern part of the reserve, on the west side of the river Batiscan.
 Bridge railway sector Beaudet, located at 9 km upstream from the northern boundary of the Portneuf Wildlife Reserve or 19.8 miles north of Island of the cross (Quebec) ("Ile-à-la-Croix"). Through this railway bridge, the train goes north along the right bank.
 Road bridge spanning the straits of Lake of the cross (Lac-Édouard) (Lac-à-la-Croix). This route can reach the discharge at the mouth of a tributary of Lake of the cross (Lac-Édouard) (fed upstream to Lake Biscuits and John Bull).
 Railway Bridge, located 8.5 km downstream of the station of Lake Édouard (Haute-Mauricie) by rail, allowing the train back on the left side, and back to the north.
This road bridge connects the forest road housing the river on the left bank and reach the Lordship of Triton.
 Railway Bridge, located 2 km downstream from the bridge above the river and 4.3 km from the station of Lake Édouard (Haute-Mauricie) by the railroad.
 Road bridge, built next to the last railway bridge at the head of the river is 2.3 km from the railway station of the city of Lake Édouard (Haute-Mauricie).
 Railway Bridge, located one kilometre from Lake Édouard (Haute-Mauricie) by water or 2.3 km from the station of Lake Édouard (Haute-Mauricie) by the railroad.
 Lock at the discharge of Edward Lake built in 1897 on the pass of the river. The lock surmounted by a bridge, used to manage the water level, to facilitate the transport of wood floating to sawmills in the village. Following the 1902 major forest fire, forest contractors have abandoned the region and the lock was abandoned. Unfortunately, the lock gave way in the great flood of spring 1928.

Note: In summary, 19 road bridges (or other infrastructure) and seven railway bridges span the river Batiscan throughout its course.

Hydroelectric power plant 
The central Saint-Narcisse is the only hydroelectric power plant ever built on the Batiscan river. However, two power plants have been built on the tributaries of the river Batiscan:
 Plant "Electric Kabibouska" erected on the Rivière des Envies, Proulxville was serving the village of Saint-Séverin and the inhabitants of Saint-Tite;
 The power plant fitted to the dam of "Chutes de la Marmite" on the Rivière-à-Pierre, upstream of "Lake Farm" (said "Deposit lake") northeast of the village. This plant served the town of Rivière-à-Pierre, especially industries.

Main attractions

Waterfall of five dollars bill 
The Waterfall of the Nine (popularly designated "Waterfall of the five dollars bill") is located approximately 0.5 km upstream of the village of Notre-Dame-de-Montauban. Scenic view is beautiful from the waterfront park (referred Park of the Waterfall) or from the bridge over the Batiscan at the level of the village, or "Bar of the Waterfall" (east side of the river). This waterfall has a great resemblance to the image on the old five Canadian dollars bill. Public park built around the falls attracts many visitors. Eight trails were built around the Park of the Waterfall, by the local Cooperative Montauban, one joined the Otis Mountain (325 m.). In addition, an elevated walkway leads visitors on a small island in the middle of the rapids. This park around the falls began to be built in 1977, for the centenary of the parish of Notre-Dame-des-Anges.

Batiscan Park (Saint-Narcisse) 
Covering an area of 400 hectares (1000 acres), the regional Batiscan River Park is dotted with waterfalls, rapids and pools in the grip of Saint-Narcisse dam. The park which is bisected by the River Batiscan, has a long elevated walkway crossing the river, many lookouts and a network of trails totaling 25 kilometres, connecting three municipalities: Saint-Stanislas (Des Chenaux), Saint-Narcisse and Sainte-Geneviève-de-Batiscan. This park offers a range of educational activities on the environment, outdoor activities and historical thematics.

See also

Related Articles:
 Batiscanie
 Island of the cross (Quebec), in Portneuf Wildlife Reserve

Municipalities:
 Lake Edward
 Rivière-à-Pierre
 Notre-Dame-de-Montauban
 Lac-aux-Sables
 Sainte-Thècle
 Saint-Adelphe
 Saint-Stanislas
 Saint-Narcisse
 Sainte-Geneviève-de-Batiscan
 Batiscan

ZEC, Wildlife Reserve and parks:
 Portneuf Wildlife Reserve
 Batiscan River Park
 Central of Saint-Narcisse

Rivers:
 Rivière des Envies
 Tawachiche River
 Pierre-Paul River
 Propre River, Quebec
 Tawachiche River
 Tawachiche West River
 List of rivers of Quebec

RCM (MRC in French), Lorship (Seigneuries):
 La Tuque
 Portneuf Regional County Municipality
 Mékinac Regional County Municipality
 Les Chenaux Regional County Municipality
 Lordship of Batiscan (Seigneurie de Batiscan)

Non organized territories:
 Linton
 Lac-Lapeyrère, Quebec
 Lac-Masketsi, Quebec

References

Sources
 

Rivers of Mauricie
Mékinac Regional County Municipality
Landforms of La Tuque, Quebec
Tributaries of the Saint Lawrence River